Acleris griseopterana is a species of moth of the family Tortricidae. It is found in China (Sichuan).

The wingspan is about 19.3 mm. The forewings have an ochreous brown triangular area from the two-fifths to four-fifths. There are black scales on the remainder of the wing. Adults have been recorded on wing in June.

References

Moths described in 1993
griseopterana
Moths of Asia